The Grand Master of the Sacred Apostolic Hospice or Quartermaster-General of the Sacred Palaces is a hereditary official of the Pontifical Household. The title and office became hereditary on June 28, 1808, when Pope Pius VII appointed Prince Francesco Ruspoli as Grand Master.

The Grand Master is a Participating Privy Chamberlain and the sole lay member of the Noble Privy Antechamber, as well as a Participating Privy Chamberlain of the Sword and Cape (made up of laymen, traditionally holding hereditary posts).

From 1808 with Francesco Ruspoli, 3rd prince of Cerveteri, the Ruspoli family assumed the office of Grand Master of the Sacred Hospice and succeeded in the Conti family.

Title holders 

The reform of the Papal Curia abolished the post in 1968, keeping the title purely honorary.

See also 

Ruspoli

References 

Officials of the Roman Curia
Nobles of the Holy See
Honorary titles of the Holy See
Papal household